Spirobarbital is a barbiturate derivative developed by Eli Lilly in the 1940s. It has hypnotic and sedative effects, and has a moderate potential for abuse.

References 

Barbiturates
Spiro compounds
GABAA receptor positive allosteric modulators
Cyclopentanes